Gastón Etlis and Martín Rodríguez were the defending champions but lost in the first round to David Ferrer and Fernando Vicente.

Mariano Hood and Sebastián Prieto won in the final 6–2, 6–2 against Lucas Arnold and David Nalbandian.

Seeds

  Gastón Etlis /  Martín Rodríguez (first round)
  František Čermák /  Leoš Friedl (semifinals)
  Simon Aspelin /  Andrew Kratzmann (first round)
  Devin Bowen /  Ashley Fisher (first round)

Draw

External links
 Copa AT&T Main Draw

ATP Buenos Aires
2003 ATP Tour
ATP